Damien Koffi Anderson Chrysostome (born May 24, 1982) is a Beninese former professional footballer who played as a defender. He spent much of his career in the Italian lower leagues before joining French club FC Metz for the 2008–09 season. The following two seasons he played for Turkish side Denizlispor. He ended his career in Finland with JJK Jyväskylä. At international leve, he made 53 appearances for the Benin national team.

Club career
Chrysostome was born in Cotonou, Benin. In Italy he was a member of the A.S. Cittadella Serie C1 squad for the 2002–03 and 2003–04 seasons and part of the 2004–05 season. The rest of 2004–05 was spent with A.S. Biellese 1902 in Serie C2. He returned to Cittadella for the 2005–06 season, then moved to Associazione Calcio Cuneo 1905 for the 2005–06 season in Serie C2. During the 2007–08 season he appeared for Casale in Serie D.

International career
In 2001, Chrysostome appeared in all three of country’s matches in the 2004 African Nations Cup. The Benin national team lost all three of their games in the first round of competition, and failed to secure qualification for the quarter-finals. He was ever-present in the 2008 tournament, when again Benin failed to progress beyond the group stage.

References

External links
 

1982 births
Living people
People from Cotonou
Association football defenders
Beninese footballers
Benin international footballers
2004 African Cup of Nations players
2008 Africa Cup of Nations players
2010 Africa Cup of Nations players
A.C. Cuneo 1905 players
Casale F.B.C. players
A.S. Cittadella players
FC Metz players
Denizlispor footballers
Ligue 2 players
Süper Lig players
Beninese expatriate footballers
Beninese expatriate sportspeople in France
Beninese expatriate sportspeople in Italy
Beninese expatriate sportspeople in Turkey
Expatriate footballers in Turkey
Expatriate footballers in Italy
Expatriate footballers in France